Tierra del Vino de Zamora is a Spanish Denominación de Origen Protegida (DOP) for wines located in the province of Zamora, Castile and León, Spain. It was officially upgraded from the lower status of QWPSR (VCPRD in Spanish) 2007.

The authorized white varieties are Malvasía, Moscatel de grano menudo, Verdejo, Albillo, Palomino and Godello while the authorized red varieties are Tempranillo, Garnacha and Cabernet Sauvignon.

References

External links 
 D.O.P. Tierra del vino de Zamora official website

Wine regions of Spain